Labeobarbus macrolepis is a species of ray-finned fish in the  family Cyprinidae.
It is found in Burundi and Tanzania.
Its natural habitats are rivers, freshwater lakes, freshwater marshes, and inland deltas.
It is becoming rare due to habitat loss.

References

macrolepis
Fish described in 1889
Taxonomy articles created by Polbot